Banské is a village and municipality in Vranov nad Topľou District in the Prešov Region of eastern Slovakia. In historical records the village was first mentioned in 1397. The municipality lies at an altitude of 325 metres and covers an area of 29.861 km².

Population
According to the 2011 census, the municipality had 1,713 inhabitants. 1,335 of inhabitants were Slovaks, 320 Roma  and 58 others and unspecified.

See also
 List of municipalities and towns in Slovakia

References

Genealogical resources

The records for genealogical research are available at the state archive "Statny Archiv in Presov, Slovakia"

 Roman Catholic church records (births/marriages/deaths): 1770-1895 (parish B)
 Greek Catholic church records (births/marriages/deaths): 1817-1934 (parish A)

External links
 
 
 https://web.archive.org/web/20070513023228/http://www.statistics.sk/mosmis/eng/run.html
 Surnames of living people in Banske

Villages and municipalities in Vranov nad Topľou District
Zemplín (region)